The American Football Conference – Northern Division or AFC North  is one of the four divisions of the American Football Conference (AFC) in the National Football League (NFL). The division was adopted after the restructuring of the 2002 NFL season, when the league realigned divisions after expanding to 32 teams. This is the only division in the NFL in which no member team has hosted a Super Bowl in their stadiums.

Formation

The AFC North currently has four members: Baltimore Ravens, Cincinnati Bengals, Cleveland Browns, and Pittsburgh Steelers. The original four members of the AFC Central were the Browns, Bengals, Steelers and Houston Oilers (now the Tennessee Titans).

The AFC North is the only AFC division that does not contain a charter team from the original American Football League. However, the Cincinnati Bengals were an AFL expansion team in the 1968 AFL season (the Steelers and Browns joined the AFC in 1970), although the Bengals joining the AFL was contingent on the team joining the NFL after the AFL–NFL merger was finalized in 1970, as Paul Brown was not a supporter of the AFL.

Three of the teams have interlocked histories. Both the Bengals and the Browns were founded by Paul Brown, while the Ravens and the city of Cleveland have their own unique relationship. Only the Steelers, who are older than the original Browns, have no direct history involving Paul Brown.

History

1970s
The AFC Central division was formed when the Browns and Steelers brought their rivalry from the NFL Century Division to the AFC in 1970, joining the newly formed "AFC Central" with the Houston Oilers (from the AFL's East Division) and Cincinnati Bengals (from the AFL's West Division).

Although the Bengals won the first AFC Central Division Championship in 1970, the Steelers dominated the division for most of the 1970s. The Steelers also would win four Super Bowls in the decade, which were also the team's first league titles.

1980s
The 1980 Cleveland Browns broke the Steelers' six-year run as division champions, but failed to advance past the divisional round of the playoffs, losing to the Oakland Raiders as a result of Red Right 88. The Bengals were the only team to represent the AFC Central in the Super Bowl during the decade, appearing in Super Bowls XVI and XXIII. Both appearances resulted in close losses to the San Francisco 49ers.

1990s
The Steelers returned as the dominant team in the division in 1992. They won five divisional titles in six years, and played in Super Bowl XXX, in which they lost to the Dallas Cowboys.

In 1992, the Oilers were involved in one of the most famous playoff games in NFL history. In a game now known as The Comeback, the Oilers surrendered a 32-point lead to the Buffalo Bills and lost in overtime, 41–38. It was the largest deficit ever overcome in the history of the NFL for nearly 30 years. 

In 1995, the Jacksonville Jaguars joined the league through expansion and were placed in the AFC Central. It was the first change to the structure of the division since its inception and added a second team to the division from the U.S. South. In 1996, in one of the most controversial decisions in American sports history, the Cleveland Browns moved to Baltimore and were rechristened as the Baltimore Ravens. Then in 1997, the Oilers moved to Tennessee but remained in the division (the team later was renamed the Titans in 1999). The makeup of the AFC Central changed once again in 1999 when the NFL reactivated the Cleveland Browns. The division had six teams for the 1999 to 2001 seasons, and was the only division to have that many teams in the post-merger era.

Aside from Pittsburgh's appearance in Super Bowl XXX, the only other appearance in the Super Bowl for the division in the decade was the Titans in Super Bowl XXXIV, who came up one yard short of the first Super Bowl to go into overtime. Along the way, the team got revenge on the Bills seven years after the Comeback in the Wild Card round by defeating the Bills 22–16 as a result of the Music City Miracle.

2000s
The decade began with the Ravens winning Super Bowl XXXV.  The team's defense, led by linebacker Ray Lewis, was arguably one of the best defenses of all time.

In 2002, the NFL realigned into eight divisions of four teams. The Jaguars and Titans—the latter winning the AFC Central title in 2000—were both moved to the new AFC South, while the rest of the AFC Central remained intact and was renamed the AFC North. The Bengals, Browns, and Steelers were guaranteed to remain in a division together in any circumstance; this was part of the NFL's settlement with the city of Cleveland in the wake of the 1995 Cleveland Browns relocation controversy. The Browns and Steelers, the two closest rivals, even ride a bus to their games instead of flying.

Since realignment, the Steelers have won the division title seven times, and the Ravens and Bengals have each won four times. The Steelers have swept all divisional opponents twice, in 2002 and 2008 (going 7 for 7 both times, winning against the Browns in a 2002 AFC Wildcard game and the Ravens in the 2008 AFC Championship), and the Ravens and Bengals have swept all three divisional opponents once each, the Bengals in 2009 and Ravens in 2011.

Since divisional realignment, the Steelers have made the playoffs ten times, the Ravens eight times, the Bengals seven times, and the Browns two times.

In 2005, although finishing second in the division to the Bengals, the Steelers became the first team in NFL history to enter the playoffs as a #6 seeded wild card team and win the Super Bowl.

In 2008, the Steelers became the first team to repeat as division champion since the division's realignment in 2002. The team went on to win Super Bowl XLIII that season, their second Super Bowl in four years and an NFL-record sixth overall.

In 2009, the Cincinnati Bengals swept their annual six-game slate of divisional opponents. Their first three games against the AFC North came in weeks three-through-five when they beat the Steelers, Browns and Ravens, respectively, each by three points. The close finishes deemed the Bengals, "Cardiac Cats." Cincinnati clinched their first division title since '05 in a week 16 victory over the Kansas City Chiefs, 17–10. In the playoffs, however, the Bengals fell to the New York Jets at home, 24–14.

Baltimore finished off their season by winning three of their final four games to finish 9-7 and earn the number-six seed in the AFC Playoffs. In the first round of the postseason, Baltimore defeated the New England Patriots in Foxboro, 33–14. In the divisional round of the postseason, Baltimore's season came to an end with a 20–3 loss to the Indianapolis Colts, who would defeat the Jets one week later to win the conference.

2010s
The Ravens repeated as division champions in 2011 and 2012.  The team went on to win Super Bowl XLVII over the San Francisco 49ers, on February 3, 2013, in New Orleans.  It was the second franchise Super Bowl win. 
As of 2012, the Steelers are the AFC North's most successful team with a 599–547–21 record all-time with the Browns 2nd in line with an overall record of 510–441–while the Ravens sit in 3rd (even though they were not an official franchise until 1996) at 164–128–and then the Bengals today remain the only team in the division with their all-time record below .500 as they sit in last at 310–396–.

In 2015, the Bengals became the first team in the AFC North (Central) to ever start the year 8–0, finishing the season 12–4 and winning the division for the second time in three years. Cincinnati clinched the division title in week 16 when the Steelers were upset by the 4–10 Ravens in Baltimore, quarterbacked by Ryan Mallett. Bengals' quarterback Andy Dalton was having his best season of his five-year career until breaking his thumb on December 13 against Pittsburgh caused him to miss the rest of the season. In the playoffs, Cincinnati (quarterbacked by A. J. McCarron) lost in a rematch with the Steelers, 18–16, in the final minutes of a heated battle. Pittsburgh advanced to the Divisional Round of the playoffs, only to lose to Peyton Manning and the eventual Super Bowl Champion Denver Broncos.

The Steelers won the division title in 2016 after a 31–27 win over the Ravens on Christmas Day. Despite victories in the playoffs against Miami and Kansas City, they fell to New England in the AFC Championship Game.

The Ravens clinched the division in Week 15 of 2019 in a 42–21 win over the NY Jets. However, they were upset by the Tennessee Titans at home in the second round as the Number 1 seed.

2020s

The Steelers won the division in 2020. The Ravens and Browns also made it into the playoffs as the 5th and 6th seeded wildcards respectively. For the Browns, it was their first playoff appearance since 2002. The Browns defeated the Steelers 48–37 in Pittsburgh for the Wild Card Round. The Ravens beat the Titans 20–13 in their Wild Card matchup. However, both the Ravens and Browns failed to win their Divisional Round matchups, losing 17–3 to the Bills and 22–17 to the Chiefs respectively.

The Bengals won the division in 2021. The Steelers were given a shocking last minute invite to the NFL Playoffs, but their journey fell short with a loss to the Kansas City Chiefs in the wild card round. The Bengals beat the Raiders at home 26-19 in the Wild Card matchup, the Titans 19-16 in Tennessee, and the Chiefs 27-24 in Kansas City to make it to the Super Bowl. Their season ended with a 23-20 loss in Super Bowl LVI to the Rams.

The Cincinnati Bengals won the division the second consecutive time in 2022. The 11-4 Bengals faced up against the 12-3 Buffalo Bills on January 2, 2023, however, Bills safety Damar Hamlin collapsed after a tackle on Tee Higgins. The game was suspended after the play. Days later, NFL commissioner Roger Goodell cancelled the game. By win percentage, the Bengals have won the North again. After a victory against the Alanta Falcons, the Baltimore Ravens clinched their playoff spot as well. On January 15, 2023, in the Super Wild Card Weekend, the #3 ranked Bengals played at home against the #6 Ravens. Bengals defeated Ravens by a score of 24-17 with the most notable play by Tyler Huntley failing a Quarterback Sneak at the Bengals 2-yard line. Huntley did not secure the football as Logan Wilson stripped and Huntley fumbled the ball and Sam Hubbard recovered the ball, running a 98-yard Scoop and Score to defeat the Ravens. This play was the longest fumble return touchdown in NFL playoff history. On January 22, the Bengals and the Bills rematched at the Bills' home stadium, Highmark Stadium. Despite the home field advantage and heavy snow conditions, the Bengals were able to upset the Bills, with a score of 27-10 after Bills quarterback Josh Allen was intercepted on the team's final offensive play by Cam-Taylor Britt. The Bengals will advance to face against the Kansas City Chiefs for the AFC Championship for the second consecutive time. This was the first ever back-to-back championship appearance in Bengals' history.

Division lineups

 Place cursor over year for division champ or Super Bowl team.

 In 1970 the division formed in American Football Conference.
After the 1995 season, the Cleveland Browns franchise was deactivated; personnel, moved to the enfranchised Baltimore Ravens. The Cleveland Browns franchise was reactivated in 1999. The Browns, Ravens, and NFL officially consider the post-1999 Browns to be a continuation of the original team founded in 1946.
Houston moved to Memphis as Tennessee Oilers in 1997, moved to Nashville in 1998 (still known as Oilers). Team was renamed Tennessee Titans in 1999.
Jacksonville Jaguars enfranchised (1995 season).
Baltimore Ravens enfranchised (1996 season)
Division renamed AFC North. Jacksonville and Tennessee moved to AFC South.

Division champions

+ A players' strike in 1982 reduced the regular season to nine games. Because of the strike, the league used for its playoffs a special 16-team "Super Bowl Tournament" just for this year. Division standings were not formally acknowledged (although every division wound up sending at least one team to the playoffs); Cincinnati had the best record of the division teams.

++ Due to the Week 17 game against the Buffalo Bills being declared a no-contest (and later cancelled), the Cincinnati Bengals officially played 16 games in the 2022 season. This, however, had no bearing on the winner of the Division as the Bengals had 2 more wins than the second placed Ravens.

Wild Card qualifiers

+  A players' strike in 1982 reduced the regular season to nine games, so the league used a special 16-team playoff tournament just for this year.

Total playoff berths
At the conclusion of the 2022 season

 Includes records of Houston & Tennessee Oilers and Jacksonville through 2001 season

Season results

^ A players' strike in 1982 reduced the regular season to nine games. Because of the strike, the league used for its playoffs a special 16-team "Super Bowl Tournament" just for this year. Division standings were not formally acknowledged (although every division wound up sending at least one team to the playoffs); Cincinnati had the best record of the division teams.

See also
Bengals–Browns rivalry
Bengals–Ravens rivalry
Bengals–Steelers rivalry
Browns–Ravens rivalry
Browns–Steelers rivalry
Ravens–Steelers rivalry

References

National Football League divisions
Baltimore Ravens
Cincinnati Bengals
Cleveland Browns
Pittsburgh Steelers
 
 
Organizations established in 1970
Sports in the Midwestern United States
1970 establishments in the United States